5-Ethyl-2-methylpyridine is an organic compound with the formula (C2H5)(CH3)C5H3N.  One of several isomeric pyridines with this formula, this derivative is of interest because it is efficiently prepared from simple reagents and it is a convenient precursor to nicotinic acid, a form of vitamin B3.  5-Ethyl-2-methylpyridine is a colorless liquid.

Synthesis and reactions
5-Ethyl-2-methylpyridine is produced by condensation of paraldehyde (a derivative of acetaldehyde) and ammonia:
4CH3CHO  +  NH3  →  (C2H5)(CH3)C5H3N  +  4H2O
The conversion is an example of a structurally complex compound efficiently made from simple precursors. Under related conditions, the condensation of acetaldehyde and ammonia delivers 2-picoline.

Oxidation of 5-ethyl-2-methylpyridine with nitric acid gives nicotinic acid via the decarboxylation of 2,5-pyridinedicarboxylic acid.

Toxicity

References

Pyridines
Foul-smelling chemicals